Dominic Mary (Paul) McGuire  (3 April 190315 June 1978) was an Australian writer, public servant and diplomat.

Life and career
McGuire was born in Peterborough, South Australia on 3 April 1903. His father, James McGuire, was the Railways Commissioner. He attended Christian Brothers College, Adelaide and the University of Adelaide. At university he was the Tinline Scholar in History. Also as a university student he helped to organise Save the Children Australia raising money for famine relief targeted to Russian children following World War I.

McGuire began story-writing with detective stories, some of which were published in the United Kingdom. Between 1932 and 1936, McGuire published ten novels, a book of verse and an essay on the poetry of Gerard Manley Hopkins.

During World War II, McGuire was an officer of the Royal Australian Naval Volunteer Reserve. In May 1945, McGuire was demobilised from the Navy and took up a role as special European correspondent for The Argus newspaper. In the role he visited Ireland, France, the Scandinavian countries, Holland, Belgium and Germany; meeting Konrad von Preysing and Martin Niemöller whilst in Germany. McGuire returned to Australia in January 1947, having also visited Canada and the United States on the way home. While in North America McGuire met personally then US President Harry S. Truman and Canadian Prime Minister Mackenzie King.

In 1949 McGuire's book There's Freedom for the Brave was published to favourable reviews, including in The New York Times and Life magazine.

In April 1953, Minister for External Affairs Richard Casey, Baron Casey announced McGuire's appointment as Australian Ambassador to Ireland, saying that the Department of External Affairs was "inadequate in sufficiently senior and experienced career personnel to fill all the Australian posts abroad," and that it was necessary to draw on experienced people from outside the department to fill some overseas posts. McGuire did not formally take up his post due to a dispute between the Australian and Irish governments about the style of his credentials. The Australian Government wanted for McGuire's title to be Ambassador to Southern Ireland, while the Irish Government wanted his title to be Ambassador to the President of the Republic of Ireland. No agreement was secured between the two governments.

In March 1954, Casey announced McGuire's appointment as Minister to Italy.

McGuire died on 15 June 1978 in North Adelaide, South Australia.

Works

Non-fiction
 Australian Journey (1939)
 Westward the course : the new world of Oceania (1942)
 The three corners of the world : an essay in the interpretation of modern politics (1948) (published in the United States and Canada as An experiment in world order)
 There's freedom for the brave : an approach to world order (1949)
 Australia's future development : the major problems of external policy (1951)
 Inns of Australia (1952)

Fiction
 A funeral in Eden (1938)

Poetry
 The two men and other poems (1932) (as D. P. McGuire)
 Selected poems of Paul McGuire (1980)

With his wife, Frances Margaret McGuire
 The price of admiralty (1944)
 The Australian theatre : an abstract and brief chronicle in twelve parts (1948)

References

1903 births
1978 deaths
Ambassadors of Australia to Ireland
Ambassadors of Australia to Italy
Australian Commanders of the Order of the British Empire
20th-century Australian writers
People from Peterborough, South Australia